Nightraiders is a vertically scrolling shooter designed by Peter Filiberti and published in 1983 by Datamost for the Atari 8-bit home computer. The game is heavily inspired by the 1982 Sega arcade game Zaxxon.

Gameplay

The object of Nightraiders is to fly through the preliminary screens in order to reach and destroy the enemy base. The player moves his ship back and forth along the bottom of the screen, firing laser cannons to destroy enemy tanks, bridges and other structures. The ship is constantly consuming fuel, which can be replenished by shooting at alien fuel canisters. At the end of each stage, the player must destroy the alien base, after which he will move on to a more difficult level.

Reception
The Addison-Wesley Book of Atari Software 1984 reviewer gave the game a poor rating (D) and found the game dull, with very little to hold his interest. Electronic Games reviewed the game in the July 1984 issue and compared it to a poor's man Zaxxon.

References

External links
Nightraiders at Atari Mania

1983 video games
Atari 8-bit family games
Atari_8-bit_family-only_games
Datamost games
Vertically scrolling shooters
Video games developed in the United States